Petteri Pennanen (born 19 September 1990) is a Finnish football player who plays as a midfielder for Ilves.

Club career
A product of local KuPS, Pennanen made his senior début on 29 April 2007, aged 16, against VIFK. A month later, he was a starter against PK-35. That season he appeared in 13 first-team matches. In February 2009 Pennanen signed a two-year contract with the Dutch team Twente along with teammate Tuomas Rannankari.

After not making a single appearance for the Twente's first-team, Pennanen left the Dutch champions during winter 2011 and signed with TPS. He signed with RoPS before the 2014 season.

On 14 January 2020, Pennanen left KuPS and signed a contract with Indonesian Liga 1 club Persikabo 1973.

In 2021, Pennanen joined USL Championship side Sacramento Republic. Pennanen was released by Sacramento following the 2021 season.

On 14 December 2021, he signed a three-year contract with Ilves.

Honours
Individual
Veikkausliiga Midfielder of the Year: 2018, 2019, 2022
Veikkausliiga Team of the Year: 2018, 2019

References

External links
 Profile at RoPS 
 
 

1990 births
Living people
Finnish footballers
Finland youth international footballers
Finland under-21 international footballers
Finland international footballers
Association football midfielders
Kuopion Palloseura players
FC Twente players
Turun Palloseura footballers
Rovaniemen Palloseura players
Miedź Legnica players
Persikabo 1973 players
Sacramento Republic FC players
FC Ilves players
Veikkausliiga players
I liga players
Indonesian Super League players
USL Championship players
Finnish expatriate footballers
Expatriate footballers in the Netherlands
Finnish expatriate sportspeople in the Netherlands
Expatriate footballers in Poland
Finnish expatriate sportspeople in Poland
Expatriate footballers in Indonesia
Finnish expatriate sportspeople in Indonesia
Expatriate soccer players in the United States
Finnish expatriate sportspeople in the United States
People from Kuopio
Sportspeople from North Savo